Little Bold John (1982–2003) was an American Thoroughbred racehorse.

Background
He was bred in Maryland by Hal C.B. Clagett and raced under the Hidden Hill Farm's banner as his owner. He finished racing with a record of 38-16-14 in 105 starts with career earnings of $2,056,406. Little Bold John was best known for his wins in the grade one Donn Handicap and the grade two General George Handicap.

In 1997, he became the first Maryland-bred horse to accumulate $1 million in career earnings, and he remains only one of six horses to have multimillion-dollar earnings from the state of Maryland. The others are Cigar, Awad, Concern, Broad Brush and the filly Safely Kept.

Racing career 
Little Bold John competed 105 times during nine seasons, winning 38 races, of which 25 were stakes. That ranks him fourth in stakes victories among thoroughbreds in North America behind Native Diver with 34 stakes wins, John Henry with 30 stakes wins, and Who Doctor Who with 26. In a 1997 interview with the Baltimore Sun, Robb said that Little Bold John, who earned $2,056,406, was the best horse he had ever trained. "Not only that," Robb said. "I think he's the best horse we ever had in Maryland. I could run him short, long, on the turf, the dirt, in the mud, and he'd win anyway. That makes him special over any horse I've ever seen."

Little Bold John overcame injuries and retirement to return to the races. In 1992, though, Robb retired the gelding permanently. "In his last race, he hurt himself about the quarter pole and dropped back to third or fourth," Robb said. "He pulled his suspensory ligament. Most horses, when they get hurt, pull up. But he came back to win the race, like he was three-legged. After that, I knew he'd end up killing himself if I kept running him."

Little Bold John's final race was on Halloween 1992 at Pimlico Race Course. He was 10, having raced every year since 1984 when he was two. His biggest win came at Gulfstream Park in the Donn Handicap a grade one stakes worth $175,000. Little Bold John paid a record $113.80 to win that race. He also won two $200,000 stakes in Maryland, including the grade two General George Handicap and the Maryland Million Classic, both at Laurel Park Racecourse.

Breeder Clagett sold Little Bold John to Anne Arundel County businessman Jack Owens after his fourth start. Robb remained as trainer and bought Little Bold John from Owens in 1990. In 1996, he gave the horse back to Clagett.

Retirement 
Following his retirement, owner-trainer Jerry Robb sent Little Bold John to live at Hidden Hill Farm in Edgewater, Maryland. The horse spent the last few years of his life at Weston Farm in Upper Marlboro, Maryland. After suffering an attack of colic, he died at age 21 on January 21, 2003, in the same field where he had lived as a youngster.

Pedigree

References

1982 racehorse births
2003 racehorse deaths
Thoroughbred family 4-r
Racehorses bred in Maryland
Racehorses trained in the United States